The following is a list of episodes for the American reality television series, Ex on the Beach that first aired on MTV on April 19, 2018.

Series overview

Episodes

Season 1 (2018)

Season 2 (2018–2019)

Season 3 (2019)

Season 4 (2019–2020)

Season 5 (2022)

Season 6 (2023)

References

External links

2010s American reality television series
2018 American television series debuts
2020s American reality television series
American television series based on British television series
English-language television shows
Ex on the Beach
MTV reality television series
Television shows set in California
Television shows set in Hawaii
Ex on the Beach